Robești may refer to several places in Romania:

 Robești, a village in Sohodol Commune, Alba County
 Robești, a village in Pârscov Commune, Buzău County
 Robești, a village in Câineni Commune, Vâlcea County
 Robești (river), a tributary of the Olt in Vâlcea County